The Regency TR-1 was the first commercially manufactured transistor radio, introduced in 1954. Despite mediocre performance, about 150,000 units were sold, due to the novelty of its small size and portability. Previously, transistors had only been used in military or industrial applications, and the TR-1 demonstrated their utility for consumer electronics, offering a prescient glimpse of a future full of small, convenient hand-held devices that would develop into calculators, mobile phones, tablets and the like. Surviving specimens are sought out by collectors.

Conception
In May 1954, Texas Instruments, previously a producer of instrumentation for the oil industry and locating devices for the US Navy, was looking for an established radio manufacturer to develop and market a radio using their transistors.  No major radio maker, including RCA, Philco, and Emerson, was interested. Ed Tudor, the president of Industrial Development Engineering Associates, (I.D.E.A), a builder of home antenna boosters, jumped at the opportunity to manufacture the TR-1, predicting sales of the transistor radios would be "20 million radios in three years."  

The Regency Division of I.D.E.A announced the TR-1 on October 18, 1954, and put it on sale in November 1954.

Design
The Regency TR-1 circuitry was refined from the Texas Instruments drawings, reducing the number of parts, including two expensive transistors.  Although this severely reduced audio output volume, it let I.D.E.A. keep the price down to $49.95, ($510 in 2021), which was a significant amount of money for such a small, untried object. 
One year after the TR-1 release, sales approached 100,000 units.  While the radio was praised for design aesthetics, novelty and small size, because of the cost cutting measures, the sensitivity and sound quality were behind the established vacuum tube based competitors, and reviews were typically adverse. A review in Consumer Reports mentioned the high level of noise and instability on certain radio frequencies, and recommended against purchase.

Aesthetics
I.D.E.A. outsourced the TR-1 exterior design to the industrial design firm of Painter, Teague and Petertil. The design was created within six weeks by way of telephone and design sketches exchanged by mail. The design won an award from the Industrial Design Society of New York and was selected by the Museum of Modern Art for the American Art and Design Exhibition in Paris in 1955.

The TR-1 was initially offered in black, bone white, mandarin red, and cloud gray, it was later uncommonly offered in olive green, mahogany, and eventually in rare colors including lavender, pearl white, turquoise, pink, and lime. It was advertised as measuring 3" × 5" × 1.25" (7.62 × 12.7 × 3.2 cm) and weighed 12 ounces (340 g) including the 22.5 volt battery. It came in a cardboard box with the color stamped on the end. An optional earphone sold for $7.50.

The red triangles on the frequency dial mark the CONELRAD frequencies of 640 and 1240 kHz.

Technical design
The TR-1 uses Texas Instruments' NPN transistors, hand-picked in sets of four. A 22.5 volt battery provides power, since the only way to get adequate radio frequency performance out of early transistors was to run them close to their collector-to-emitter breakdown voltage. The current drain from this battery is only 4 mA, allowing 20 to 30 hours of operation, in comparison to only several hours for the portable receivers based on vacuum tubes. The Regency TR-1 was patented by Richard C. Koch, Project Engineer at I.D.E.A.

Circuit 

The TR-1 is a superheterodyne receiver made with four n-p-n germanium transistors and one diode. It contains a single transistor converter stage, followed by two intermediate-frequency amplifier stages. After detection, a single-transistor stage amplifies the audio frequency. All amplifier stages use common emitter amplifiers. Stages are transformer coupled, with tuned transformers for the intermediate frequency amplifiers and a miniature audio transformer for the loudspeaker. The intermediate frequency transformers are paired with capacitors, and hand tuned to the intermediate frequency (262 kHz) using movable cores.

The circuit was designed so as to get the maximum possible gain out of the first three transistors (which operated at radio frequencies). The first transistor used as a frequency converter was operated very close to its VCBO of 30 volts (from the 22.5 volt battery). This gives a larger depletion layer between the collector and the base which reduces the parasitic feedback due to the Miller effect and extends the frequency range. The two intermediate frequency amplifier transistors are neutralised to cancel out their parasitic Miller effect feedback which also extends their frequency range. Replacement transistors were supplied with the correct neutralising capacitor of 100-200 pF.

The receiver has automatic gain control. The DC level of the detected signal is filtered with a large capacitor and used to control the gain of the first IF stage.

The 22.5 V battery, while now uncommon, is still used in some devices and  remains available on the market. The minimum required voltage is lower, about 15 V, below which the radio oscillates. An electrolytic capacitor is connected in parallel to the battery to improve stability. The power switch is coupled with the volume control.

Manufacture
Regency began assembling TR-1s on October 25, 1954, supervising a collective effort by manufacturers around the country. The transistors and transformers came from Texas Instruments in Dallas. Capacitors came from International Electronics, Inc. of Nashville, Erie Electronics of Erie, Pennsylvania, and Centralab of Milwaukee, Wisconsin. The speakers came from Jensen in Chicago, Illinois. IF transformers came from Vokar of Dexter, Michigan. The volume control came from the Chicago Telephone Supply in Elkhart, Indiana. The tuning capacitor came from Radio Condenser Co. in Camden, New Jersey. The Richardson Company in Melrose Park, Illinois and Indianapolis supplied the circuit board material to Joseph B. Weaver, founder of Photos by Weaver/I.D.E.A./Regency Electronics/Printed Writing, Inc., that manufactured the first circuit board in the basement of his home in Fishers, IN. The actual plastic case for the TR-1 was produced by Argus Plastics in Indianapolis, Indiana.

See also

References

External links

 Schematic of Regency TR-1 
 Regency TR-1 Transistor Radio History: Web site with many historical references on the web and in published literature

1954 in radio
History of radio
Models of radios
Products introduced in 1954
Radio in the United States
Texas Instruments hardware